was a politician in Japan's Liberal Democratic Party (LDP) who served as state minister for Hokkaido and Okinawa development agencies. Abe was not related to former Prime Minister Shinzo Abe, whose surname is pronounced identically but written using different characters (安倍).

Career
Abe was first elected to the lower house in 1969. He was state minister for Okinawa and Hokkaido development agencies in 1989 in the cabinet of Toshiki Kaifu. Abe served as secretary general and treasurer of Kiichi Miyazawa's faction in the LDP until December 1991. Abe resigned from his post after newspaper reports of the alleged bribes. Abe retired from politics in 1993.

Bribery scandal
Abe was arrested due to his involvement in a bribery scandal on 13 January 1992. In 1994, he was sentenced by the Tokyo District Court to three years in prison. However, the verdict was rejected by the Tokyo High Court and the Supreme Court.

Death
Fumio Abe died of heart failure in Hakodate, Hokkaido, on 6 December 2006. He was 84.

References

20th-century Japanese politicians
1922 births
2006 deaths
Government ministers of Japan
Liberal Democratic Party (Japan) politicians